Disautel Pass (el. 3252 ft./991 m.) is a mountain pass in the state of Washington.

It is traversed by State Route 155 between Grand Coulee and Omak, and is located on the Colville Indian Reservation about 12 miles Northwest of Colville Indian Agency.

References

Mountain passes of Washington (state)
Mountain passes of Okanogan County, Washington